Papilio doddsi is a species of swallowtail butterfly from the genus Papilio that is found in Vietnam.

References

Other sources
Erich Bauer and Thomas Frankenbach, 1998 Schmetterlinge der Erde, Butterflies of the world Part I (1), Papilionidae Papilionidae I: Papilio, Subgenus Achillides, Bhutanitis, Teinopalpus. Edited by  Erich Bauer and Thomas Frankenbach.  Keltern : Goecke & Evers ; Canterbury : Hillside Books 

doddsi
Butterflies described in 1896
Butterflies of Indochina